James Corcoran was an American sound engineer. He won an Academy Award for Sound Recording and was nominated for three more in the same category.

Selected filmography
Corcoran won an Academy Award and was nominated for three more:

Won
 The Sound of Music (1965)

Nominated
 Cleopatra (1963)
 The Agony and the Ecstasy (1965)
 The Sand Pebbles (1966)

References

External links

Year of birth missing
Year of death missing
20th Century Studios people
American audio engineers
Best Sound Mixing Academy Award winners